Johann Gottlieb Kugelann (2 January 1753 – 8 September 1815) was a German entomologist. A pharmacist by profession, Kugelann worked on Coleoptera.

He published (with Johann Karl Wilhelm Illiger and Johann Christian Ludwig Hellwig) in 1798 Verzeichniss der Käfer Preussens.

References
 

1753 births
1815 deaths
Scientists from Königsberg
German entomologists
Coleopterists